Colonel John T. Milner (1826 – August 18, 1898) was an engineer and a businessman.  He accumulated wealth in lumber and coal mine interests in Bolling, Alabama.  He started the Milner Coal and Railroad Mines.

He was a native of Pike County, Georgia.  He spent his early youth in the Dahlonega, Georgia gold fields.  He received a classical training at Athens, Georgia.  In 1848 he went to California to follow the San Francisco gold rush and eventually became the City Surveyor of San Jose, California.  He moved to Alabama in 1852 and built a number of railroads.  He laid out some of the first railroad lines that ran across Alabama.  The primary one was the "North and South" which traversed from Birmingham to Montgomery.  As a railroad engineer, he was the principal player in choosing site of the City of Birmingham, based on his assessment of the strategic resources and transportation advantages of Jones Valley in Alabama.  It is due to his rail line that Birmingham was brought into existence.

In many respects, he was the father of Southern industrialization, particularly in the deep, deep South.  Milner's vision triggered decades of rapid industrial growth.

He represented Jefferson County in the Alabama Senate for eight years.  He was the most conspicuous figure in the creation of Birmingham and one of the most distinguished citizens of Alabama.  He died in New Castle, Alabama of paralysis and was interred at Oak Hills Cemetery in Birmingham, Alabama.

"Slavery by Another Name"

According to a 2011 PBS documentary: "(Milner) was also a supreme racist and a despotic person."  He stated, for example, "Negro labor can be made exceedingly profitable in manufacturing iron and in rolling mills, provided there is an overseer: a Southern man who knows how to manage Negroes." After emancipation, Milner was instrumental in the movement of industrialists to replace slavery with "convict" Black laborers.  His influence was also a primary cause of peonage. He found that it was impossible to drive "free" labor the same way that they could force prisoners to mine and build railroad infrastructure. This is why people like Milner wanted prisoners in his coal mines. He saw them as a great source of profit and did not have to worry about labor disputes.

References

1826 births
1898 deaths
American railway entrepreneurs
19th-century American businesspeople